Rainer Schüttler defeated Tim Henman 6–4, 5–7, 6–1 to win the 1999 Qatar Open singles competition. Petr Korda was the defending champion.

Seeds

  Tim Henman (final)
  Greg Rusedski (first round)
  Yevgeny Kafelnikov (second round)
  Goran Ivanišević (quarterfinals)
  Petr Korda (first round)
  Thomas Johansson (first round)
  Cédric Pioline (semifinals)
  Jan Siemerink (first round)

Draw

Finals

Section 1

Section 2

External links
 1999 Qatar Open Singles Draw

1999 Qatar Open
1999 ATP Tour
Qatar Open (tennis)